The Shaoshan 4 (Chinese: 韶山4) is a type of electric locomotive used on the People's Republic of China's national railway system. This locomotive was built by the Zhuzhou Electric Locomotive Works. The power supply was industrial-frequency single-phase AC, and the axle arrangement Bo′Bo′+Bo′Bo′.

In 1993, Zhuzhou Electric Locomotive Works produced SS4G (Chinese: 韶4改). SS4G are very similar to standard SS4, apart from an improved electrical technology.

SS4 Electric Locomotive is an eight shaft fixing reconnection heavy freight electric locomotive which based on two four-axle locomotives connected. One unit, SS4-0043, was damaged in a tunnel during the 2008 Sichuan earthquake.

Manufacturers
SS4s have been manufactured by several companies:
 Zhuzhou Electric Locomotive Works (0001～0158; 0159～1175; 1886)
 Datong Electric Locomotive Works (6001～6168)
 Ziyang Locomotive Works (3001～3002)
 Dalian locomotive works (7001～7110; 7121～7241)

See also
 China Railways SS1
 China Railways SS3
 China Railways SS3B
 China Railways 8K
 China Railways 8G

Preservation
 SS4-0063: is preserved at Taiyuan Locomotive Depot, Taiyuan Railway Bureau
 SS4-0168: is preserved at the China Railway Museum
 SS4-6001: is preserved at the China Railway Museum

References

Bo′Bo′+Bo′Bo′ locomotives
SS4
25 kV AC locomotives
Railway locomotives introduced in 1985
Standard gauge locomotives of China